Amandine Marshall (born 29 November 1980) is an Egyptologist, archaeologist and French author. She became an associate researcher at the French Archaeological Mission of Thebes West (MAFTO) in 2005.

Early life and education 
Marshall was born on 29 November 1980 in Toulouse, France.
She graduated with a BA in Art History and Archeology from Charles de Gaulle University – Lille III in 2003 and a PhD in Social and Historical Anthropology, Egyptology from EHESS in 2013.

Career 
In 2005 Marshall became an associate researcher at the French Archaeological Mission of Thebes West (MAFTO).

Marshall is a doctor of the Ecole des Hautes Etudes en Sciences Sociales of Toulouse (School for Advanced Studies in the Social Sciences) after having supported a thesis titled "The children in ancient Egypt of the predynastic times at the end of the New Kingdom", in 2013. This research work has been the subject of a continuing publication by Éditions du Rocher.

One year after leading an unsuccessful project to create a museum in memory of the French Egyptologist Auguste Mariette, she published a biography of the French archaeologist in 2010. She has written several other works, especially for adults and children. Marshall participates in the excavations directed by Christian Leblanc on the site of the Ramesseum.

Selected publications

Scientific Works

Children's Books 
Thoth tales: fables, tales and myths from ancient Egypt, 2019
Dudu and the Cat goddess, 2018 (with Vinciane Schleef)
Welcome to the school of the little scribes, 2016 (with Thierry Plus)
Ancient Egypt, 2011
Diary of a child in Ancient Egypt: Meryra, Set Maat, 1480 BC., 2004 (with Michaël Welply, Caroline Picard, Jérôme Brasseur and Jean-François Péneau)

Scientific articles 
Amandine Marshall,  Pseudo-mummies, fake mummies and bodies delivered in "kit form", Ancient Egypt Magazine 107/18.5, London, 2018, .
Amandine Marshall,  Excavating at the Ramesseum, Ancient Egypt Magazine 104/18.2, London, 2017, .
Amandine Marshall,  About the efficacy of garlickly breath to predict a good delivery, Ancient Egypt Magazine 101/18.1, London, 2017, .
Amandine Marshall,  About the efficacy of Egyptian pregnancy tests, Ancient Egypt Magazine 97/17.1, London, 2016, .
Amandine Marshall,  About the efficacy of an Egyptian contraceptive with crocodile excrement, Ancient Egypt Magazine 96/16.6, London, 2016, .
Amandine Marshall,  About the efficacy of eating fly specks in ancient Egypt, Ancient Egypt Magazine 93/16.3, London, 2016, .
Amandine Marshall,  About the efficacy of eating a cooked mouse in ancient Egypt, Ancient Egypt Magazine 88/15.4, London, 2015, .
Amandine Marshall,  Fly & lion: military awards in ancient Egypt, Kmt : a Modern Journal of Ancient Egypt 26/3, Sebastopol, 2014, .
Amandine Marshall,  The child and the hoopoe , Kmt : a Modern Journal of Ancient Egypt 26/2, Sebastopol, 2014, .
Amandine Marshall,  On the origins of Egyptian mummification , Kmt : a Modern Journal of Ancient Egypt 25/2, Sebastopol, 2014, .

References 

Living people
1980 births
French Egyptologists
Archaeologists from Toulouse